William Wells Newell (1839–1907) was an American folklorist, school teacher, minister and philosophy professor.

Biography
Newell was born in Cambridge, Massachusetts. He graduated from Harvard College and Harvard Divinity School. After trying his hand at ministry, he was a faculty member at the new philosophy department at Harvard University for a few years. However, the bulk of Newell's career was as a school teacher. He taught at the Wells Schoolfounded by his grandfather, William Wellssituated on Elmwood Avenue. Newell founded the American Folklore Society in 1888 where he edited the Journal of American Folklore. His best known work is Games and Songs of American Children (1883, Mineola, N. Y.). The songs included tunes with the lyrics, and this book is the first collection of the folk music of American children. Dover Publications of New York published a reprint edition (with a new introduction and index by Carl Withers); Nabu Press published the book again in 2010.

Legacy
The American Folklore Society's Children's Folklore Section awards the annual  Prize, which is presented for the best student essay.

References

Dictionary of American Biography

External links

 
 
 
 William Wells Newell
 American Folklore Society

1839 births
1907 deaths
Harvard University faculty
American folklorists
Harvard Divinity School alumni
Harvard College alumni